Warwick Farm Racecourse is a closed railway station on the Main South railway line in New South Wales, Australia. The station served the Warwick Farm Racecourse. The station opened in 1889 and closed in 1990.

References

Disused railway stations in Sydney
Railway stations in Australia opened in 1889
Railway stations closed in 1990